Mario Altmann (born November 4, 1986) is an Austrian professional ice hockey player. He is currently playing with Graz99ers of the ICE Hockey League (ICEHL).

Playing career
Having previously played five seasons in the EBEL with EC VSV, on April 16, 2015, Altmann signed a one-year contract with Austrian rivals EHC Black Wings Linz.

After five seasons with the Black Wings in Linz, Altmann left as a free agent and signed a one-year contract with Graz99ers on 14 August 2020.

International play
Altmann is a long-time member of the Austria men's national ice hockey team who has participated at the 2009, 2011, and 2011 IIHF World Championships, and also at the 2014 Winter Olympics.

Career statistics

Regular season and playoffs

International

References

External links

1986 births
Living people
Austrian ice hockey defencemen
EHC Black Wings Linz players
Ice hockey players at the 2014 Winter Olympics
Karlskrona HK players
Olympic ice hockey players of Austria
Örebro HK players
Ice hockey people from Vienna
Vienna Capitals players
EC VSV players